Niels Versteijnen (born 3 February 2000) is a Dutch handball player for VfL Lübeck-Schwartau and the Dutch national team.

He represented the Netherlands at the 2020 European Men's Handball Championship.

References

External links

Living people
2000 births
Sportspeople from Groningen (city)
Dutch male handball players
SG Flensburg-Handewitt players
Handball-Bundesliga players
Expatriate handball players
Dutch expatriate sportspeople in Germany